The 1990 Coalite World Matchplay was a professional non-ranking snooker tournament that took place in December 1990 in Brentwood, England.
  
Jimmy White won the event for the second year running, defeating Stephen Hendry 18–9 in the final.

Main draw

Final

References

World Matchplay
World Matchplay (snooker)
World Matchplay (snooker)
1990